Koloi Mikailovich Kartoev (born 20 February 1990 in Ingushetia), also known as Selim Yaşar or Zelimkhan Kartoev, is an Ingush-born Russian naturalized Turkish freestyle wrestler, Junior and Cadet World Champion. Runner-up 2015 World Wrestling Championships and bronze medalist 2014 World Wrestling Championships. Winner Wenceslas Ziolkowski Memorial XLIX. He is a Turkish national wrestling champion. He won a silver medal at the 2016 Summer Olympics, losing to Russian Abdulrashid Sadulaev. Yaşar became bronze medalist at the 2017 European Wrestling Championships in Novi Sad, Serbia.

References

External links
 

1990 births
Living people
Ingush people
People from Nazranovsky District
Russian male sport wrestlers
Turkish male sport wrestlers
World Wrestling Championships medalists
Wrestlers at the 2016 Summer Olympics
Olympic wrestlers of Turkey
Naturalized citizens of Turkey
Russian emigrants to Turkey
Turkish people of Russian descent
Olympic silver medalists for Turkey
European Wrestling Championships medalists
Islamic Solidarity Games medalists in wrestling
Islamic Solidarity Games competitors for Turkey